The Rund um Düren is a cycling road race held in mid-April in Germany. The event, ranked at 1.2 on the UCI European calendar, is contested around the city of Düren. Prior to 1996 it was an amateur event.

Winners

External links
 Official site

Cycle races in Germany
UCI Europe Tour races
Recurring sporting events established in 1950
1950 establishments in West Germany
Sport in North Rhine-Westphalia